Mount Garth is a summit in Banff National Park, Alberta, Canada located directly south of Coronation Mountain.

Mount Garth was named in 1920 after John McDonald of Garth, a businessman in the fur industry.

See also 
 List of mountains in the Canadian Rockies

References

Mountains of Banff National Park
Three-thousanders of Alberta
Alberta's Rockies